Jana transvaalica is a moth in the  family Eupterotidae. It was described by Strand in 1911. The Global Lepidoptera Names Index has this as a synonym of Jana eurymas. It is found in South Africa.

References

Moths described in 1911
Janinae